Harold Jones may refer to:

 Harold W. Jones (1877–1958), Director of the US Army Medical Library
 Harold Spencer Jones (1890–1960), British astronomer
 Harold Jones (artist) (1904–1992), British artist, illustrator and author of children's books
 Harold Jones (rugby) (1907–1955), rugby union and rugby league footballer of the 1920s and 1930s
 Harold Jones (drummer) (born 1940), known for his work with other jazz musicians such as Count Basie
 Griffith Jones (actor) (Harold Jones, 1909–2007), British stage and television actor
 Harold Jones (murderer) (1906–1971), Welsh child killer
 Harold Jones (footballer) (1933–2003), English football defender
 Harold V. Jones II (born 1969), American politician in Georgia
Harold Jones (bishop), American prelate of the Episcopal Church

See also
Harold E. Jones Child Study Center, a research center affiliated with the University of California at Berkeley
Harry Jones (disambiguation)